is a Japanese actor.

Early life
Yanagi was born on December 21, 1985, in Berlin, Germany. He lived in Germany for three years before moving back with his family to Japan. His family moved to India for work, and he lived there for three years. However, in the fourth grade, he attended an American boarding school. Yanagi's family moved back to Japan where he finished school.

Career

D-BOYS
Yanagi is a member of the young men's stage acting troupe, D-BOYS, which act in skit-like performances.  He acted in the web drama, Hice Cool!, and had a supporting role in the movie Aa~! Izakaya Puroresu, a wrestling film. He also acted in the drama Rocket Boys.  Yanagi acted in the D-BOYS TV drama DD-Boys.  His first major film role is as the otaku lead character in  Chikan Otoko In 2007, Yanagi acted in a drama named Puzzle(), where he played a prominent role with a couple of other D-boys.

In 2007, he appeared as the main character in the musical Cooky Clown. In March of the same year, he participated as a guest in "Out of Order".

Musicals 
Yanagi originated the role of Ryoma Echizen in Musical: The Prince of Tennis (commonly known as Tenimyu). In 2003, after leaving a rehearsal for Remarkable 1st Match: Fudomine, Yanagi was involved in a car accident. He had extensive damage to his body and vocal cords and was in a coma for two weeks. As a result of the accident, Yanagi now walks with a permanent limp, his voice is forever changed, and his speech pattern is slightly slurred.

After recovering, he continued to play his role along with the second generation Seigaku cast, which featured most of the D-BOYS members. On March 29, 2006, Yanagi graduated from the role after his performance in Dream Live 3rd. Yanagi reprised his role as Echizen and reunited with the first Seigaku cast to perform in Tenimyu'''s Dream Live 7th concert to celebrate the end of the series' first season.

Yanagi starred in the stage play Taikan Kisetsu. He is currently the lead character in the drama Tadashii Ōji no Tsukurikata''.

In November 2014, Yanagi announced he was taking a long-term hiatus due his health.

Filmography

Film

Theatre

References

External links
Yanagi Kotarou's weblog (archived)

1985 births
Living people
Japanese male actors